Derek Blomfield  (31 August 1920 – 23 July 1964) was a British actor who appeared in a number of stage, film and television productions between 1935 and his death in 1964.

Career
He trained at LAMDA and made his first stage appearance at the Savoy Theatre in 1934. His stage credits included the title role in The Guinea Pig at the Criterion Theatre, a long run in Witness for the Prosecution at the Winter Garden Theatre, and two years playing Trotter in The Mousetrap at the Ambassadors Theatre in London. 

His first film role was at the age of fifteen in the film Turn of the Tide. He first came to wider attention for his appearance as a schoolboy in the Will Hay comedy, The Ghost of St. Michael's. In 1964 he played the role of Count Luzau-Rischenheim in the British television series Rupert of Hentzau. 

He died of a heart attack, aged 43, while on holiday with his wife and family in Brittany.

Filmography

References

Further reading 
 Dye, David. Child and Youth Actors: Filmography of Their Entire Careers, 1914-1985. Jefferson, NC: McFarland & Co., 1988, p. 22.
 Holmstrom, John. The Moving Picture Boy: An International Encyclopaedia from 1895 to 1995, Norwich, Michael Russell, 1996, p. 100.

1920 births
1964 deaths
English male stage actors
English male film actors
English male television actors
Male actors from London
20th-century English male actors